This article displays the qualifying draw of the 2011 St. Petersburg Open.

Players

Seeds

Qualifiers

Qualifying draw

First qualifier

Second qualifier

Third qualifier

Fourth qualifier

References
 Qualifying Draw

2011 - qualifying
St. Petersburg Open - qualifying
2011 in Russian tennis